Heydarabad (also Romanized as Ḩeydarābād; also known as Ḩeydar Kar) is a village in Azna Rural District, in the Central District of Khorramabad County, Lorestan Province, Iran. At the 2006 census, its population was 467, in 76 families.

References 

Towns and villages in Khorramabad County